Samson Ruzhentsev (born 23 October 2001) is a Russian professional basketball player for CSKA Moscow of the VTB United League. He played college basketball for the Florida Gators.

Early career
Ruzhentsev played high school basketball with Hamilton Heights Christian Academy in Chattanooga, Tennessee as a senior. He averaged 19.3 points and 6.3 rebounds per game, helping lead the team to a 28–3 record. Also, Ruzhentsev helped Hamilton Heights to three straight NACA national championships.

As a college freshman, Ruzhentsev appeared in 20 games (including one start) at University of Florida in their 2020–21 season, recording two points per game.

Professional career
On 17 June 2021, Ruzhentsev signed a contract with Mega Basket of the Basketball League of Serbia and the ABA League. In the ABA League, Samson played 21 matches, averaging 6.8 points (with 40% from the field and 50% from behind the arc) and making 3 rebounds in 16 minutes of playing time. And in the Basketball League of Serbia, Ruzhentsev became the team's top scorer. In nine games, he averaged 14.6 points and 6.8 rebounds, which is also the best result among Mega players.

In June 2022, Ruzhentsev signed for CSKA Moscow.

National team career
Ruzhentsev was a member of the Russia national under-18 team that took the 6th place at the 2019 FIBA U18 European Championship in Volos, Greece. Over six tournament games, he averaged team-high 12.3 points, 3.2 rebounds, and an assist per game.

Career statistics

College

|-
| style="text-align:left;"| 2020–21
| style="text-align:left;"| Florida
| 20 || 1 || 7.4 || .341 || .286 || .800 || .7 || .1 || .1 || .1 || 2.0

References

External links
Florida Gators bio

2001 births
Living people
ABA League players
Basketball League of Serbia players
Basketball players from Moscow
Florida Gators men's basketball players
KK Mega Basket players
Russian expatriate basketball people in Serbia
Russian expatriate basketball people in the United States
Russian men's basketball players
Shooting guards
Small forwards